Panormos or Panormus, meaning "sheltered harbor", may refer to:

Places

Ancient places
Panormus (Achaea), a town of ancient Achaea, Greece
Panormus (Attica), a town of ancient Attica, Greece
Panormus (Caria), a town of ancient Caria, now in Turkey
Panormus (Cephalonia), a town of ancient Cephalonia, Greece
Panhormus (Cilicia), a town of ancient Cilicia, now in Turkey
Panormos (Crete), a town of ancient Crete, Greece
Panormus (Epirus), a city of ancient Epirus, now in Albania
Panormus (Halicarnassus), a town of ancient Caria on the Halicarnassus peninsula, now in Turkey
Panormus (Ionia), a town of ancient Ionia, now in Turkey
Panormus (Megaris), a town of ancient Megaris, Greece
Panormus (Skopelos), a town of ancient Skopelos, Greece
Panormus (Thrace), a town of ancient Thrace, now in Turkey
Palermo in Sicily, Italy, known in antiquity as Panormos/Panormus
Bandırma in Turkey, founded as Panormos
Pisilis, also known as Panormos, in Turkey
Panormo, the highest peak of the Alburni mountain range, Campania, Italy
Panormos bay in the northwest corner of the island of Astypalaia, Dodecanese, Greece
Panorma bay (and Panorma beach) between Porto Palermo and Queparo, Himara district, Albania

Modern places
Panormos, Tinos, a village and a community on the island of Tinos, Cyclades, Greece
Panormos, Naxos, a gulf and natural harbor, Apeiranthos, Naxos, Cyclades, Greece
Panormos, Kalymnos, a village on the island of Kalymnos, Dodecanese, Greece
Panormos, a harbor on the island of Samos, Greece
Panormos, Skopelos, a village on the island of Skopelos, Greece
Panormos, Rethymno, a village in the Rethymno regional unit, Crete, Greece
Panormos, Phocis, a village in Phocis, Greece

Other uses
Battle of Panormus (251 BC), at the site of present-day Palermo
Siege of Panormus
Greek torpedo boat Panormos, which served in the Greek navy from 1919–1928